Erodium ciconium, the common stork's bill, is a species of annual herb in the family Geraniaceae. They have a self-supporting growth form and simple, broad leaves. Individuals can grow to 21 cm tall.

Sources

References 

ciconium
Flora of Malta